The Château des Ducs de Joyeuse is a  castle in the commune of Couiza in the Aude département of France.

Originally built for the Dukes of Joyeuse in the mid-16th century, the castle is now used as a hotel. The well-preserved building, flanked by round towers, is regarded as typical of many buildings in the Languedoc and Cévennes regions. A pitted rustic work doorway leads to the austere Renaissance courtyard.

It has been listed since 1913 as a monument historique by the French Ministry of Culture.

See also
List of castles in France

References

External links
 

Monuments historiques of Aude
Châteaux in Aude
Hotels in France